¿Quién es quién? (English title: Who is Who?), is an American telenovela produced by Gemma Lombardi, Joshua Mintz
and Carmen Cecilia Urbaneja for Telemundo. It is an adaptation of the telenovela produced in 2003, Amor descarado.

Danna Paola, Eugenio Siller, Laura Flores and Carlos Espejel star opposite Kimberly Dos Ramos and Jonathan Islas.

Production 
The cast of the telenovela was confirmed on August 18, 2015. The telenovela is filmed in locations such as; Santa Monica, California, Los Angeles, Miami, United States.

Plot 
¿Quién es quién? is a story about twin brothers, one rich and the other poor, who were separated at birth and reunited several years laters by fate. However their polar opposite lives are switched. Through this journey they search and discover themselves.

Cast

Main 
 Eugenio Siller as Pedro "Perico" Pérez / Leonardo Fuentemayor
 Kimberly Dos Ramos as Fernanda Manrique/Isabela Blanco 
 Danna Paola as Paloma Hernandez 
 Laura Flores as Inés  
 Jonathan Islas as Ignacio
 Carlos Espejel as Basilio

Recurring 

 Gabriel Valenzuela as Jonathan
 Sandra Destenave as Fabiola Carbajal
 Oka Giner as Yesenia
 Guillermo Quintanilla as Elmer Homero Pérez "Chamoy"
 Fernando Carrera as Humberto Fuentemayor
 Daniela Wong as Constanza "Connie"
 Isabella Castillo as Tania Sierra
 Nicolas Maglione as Salvador "Cachito"
 Ximena Duque as Clarita/Blanca Altamira
 Marisa del Portillo as Magdalena 
 Silvana Arias as La Cocó
 Armando Torrea as Santiago Manrique
 Gabriel Rossi as Rubén
 Maite Embil as Nora
 Kenya Hijuelos as Ivonne
 Ruben Morales as Justino
 Adrián Di Monte as Eugenio
 Isabel Moreno as Sara
 Alex Ruiz as Terminator 
 Maria del Pilar Pérez as Daniela
 Sofia Reca as Renata
 Fernando Pacanins as Melquiades
 Daniela Macias as Lupita
 Gisella Abounrad as Tencha
 Vince Miranda as Sebastián

Awards and nominations

Broadcast 
The series originally aired from October 26, 2015 to April 8, 2016 in Mexico on Gala TV. The series premiered on February 9, 2016, in United States on Telemundo.

References

External links 
 

Telemundo telenovelas
Spanish-language American telenovelas
American telenovelas
2015 American television series debuts
2015 telenovelas
2016 American television series endings
Television series reboots